German submarine U-563 was a Type VIIC U-boat of Nazi Germany's Kriegsmarine during World War II. She carried out eight patrols and sank three ships, totalling , as well as one warship of 1,870 tons. Two ships were damaged, totalling . She was a member of nine wolfpacks, and was sunk by Allied aircraft in the Bay of Biscay on 31 May 1943.

Design
German Type VIIC submarines were preceded by the shorter Type VIIB submarines. U-563 had a displacement of  when at the surface and  while submerged. She had two shafts and two  propellers.

U-563 was fitted with five  torpedo tubes (four fitted at the bow and one at the stern), fourteen torpedoes, one  SK C/35 naval gun, 220 rounds, and a  C/30 anti-aircraft gun. The boat had a complement of between forty-four and sixty.

Service history
The submarine was laid down on 30 March 1940 at Blohm & Voss, Hamburg as yard number 539, launched on 5 February 1941 and commissioned on 27 March under the command of Oberleutnant zur See Klaus Bargsten.

She served with the 1st U-boat Flotilla from 27 March 1941 for training and stayed with that organization for operations.

First patrol
U-432s first patrol was from Kiel in Germany, she headed for the Atlantic Ocean via the gap separating the Faroe and Shetland Islands.

She arrived at Brest in occupied France on 10 September 1941.

Second patrol
Having left Brest on 4 October 1941, U-563 was unsuccessfully attacked by a Bristol Blenheim a day later west of Brittany.

Although forced to submerge, the boat did not sustain any damage.

Third patrol
On 30 November 1941, U-563 was attacked by an Armstrong Whitworth Whitley of No. 502 Squadron RAF in the Bay of Biscay. The damage was serious enough that the submarine could not dive and the commander was wounded, obliging the boat to return to Germany for repairs.

Fourth and fifth patrols
For her fourth sortie, U-563 again put out into the Atlantic, sailing west of Ireland. She then turned northeast for the gap between the Faroe and Shetland Islands. She arrived at Bergen in Norway on 3 February 1942.

Her fifth patrol, following short trips to Hamburg and Kiel, was in many respects, her fourth outing in reverse – starting in Kiel and finishing in Brest.

Sixth patrol
The boat returned to Brest on 14 January 1943.

Seventh patrol
U-563 was attacked by a Bristol Beaufighter on 22 March 1943 which caused only slight damage. U-563 was then attacked on the seventh by a B-24 Liberator of 86 Squadron. Damage was slight, but two men were lost when the submarine crash-dived.

On her most successful day, 12 April 1943, the boat sank the Pacific Grove and damaged the Fresno City southeast of Cape Farewell (Greenland). U-563 also sank the Dutch ship Ulysses in the same area.

Eighth patrol and loss
The boat left Brest for the last time on 29 May 1943. On the 31st, she was sunk by two British Handley Page Halifaxes of 58 Squadron and an Australian Sunderland flying boat of No. 10 Squadron RAAF and a Sunderland from No. 228 Squadron RAF.

Forty-nine men died with U-563;

Wolfpacks
U-563 took part in nine wolfpacks, namely:
 Grönland (10 – 23 August 1941)
 Kurfürst (23 August – 2 September 1941)
 Seewolf (2 – 7 September 1941)
 Breslau (4 – 29 October 1941)
 Panther (11 – 16 October 1942)
 Puma (16 – 29 October 1942)
 Falke (28 December 1942 – 5 January 1943)
 Löwenherz (1 – 10 April 1943)
 Lerche (10 – 16 April 1943)

Summary of raiding history

References

Notes

Citations

Bibliography

External links

German Type VIIC submarines
U-boats commissioned in 1941
U-boats sunk in 1943
U-boats sunk by Australian aircraft
U-boats sunk by depth charges
1941 ships
Ships built in Hamburg
Ships lost with all hands
World War II shipwrecks in the Atlantic Ocean
World War II submarines of Germany
Maritime incidents in May 1943